Guillaume-Hippolyte Van Volxem (13 February 1791 – 17 April 1868) was a Belgian lawyer and liberal politician.

As a graduate of the l’École de droit de Bruxelles, he becomes a lawyer at the bar of Brussels.

He began his political career in 1830, when he was designated as temporary member of the national congress. In the same year, he was elected as alderman in Brussels and he was re-elected in 1836. Later he became a member of the provincial council of the Brabant and a member of the Belgian Chamber of Representatives (1837–1845).

After the death of Nicolas-Jean Rouppe in 1838, he became the second burgomaster of the Belgian capital since the country's independence in 1830, as the communal council designates himon 13 September 1838 to fulfill the functions of burgomaster of Brussels (1838–1841). He resigned as burgomaster when on 13 April 1841, he became Minister for Justice (1841–1842) in the cabinet of Jean-Baptiste Nothomb who succeeded on that day the liberal Joseph Lebeau, who had resigned. But van Volxem only stayed minister for twenty months, because Nothomb on 14 December 1842, took on its own account the position of Minister for Justice, in addition to the post of Prime Minister.

On 16 April 1843, the post of Minister for Justice went to the catholic Jules d'Anethan after the Belgian elections in the spring of 1843. In 1845, at 54 years of age, Guillaume van Volxem withdrew from political life. He was the father of Jules Van Volxem.

See also
 List of mayors of the City of Brussels

References
 Du Bois, A., Les Bourgmestres de Bruxelles, in : Revue de Belgique, April 1896, p. 365-396.
 De Paepe, Jean-Luc, Raindorf-Gérard, Christiane (red), Le Parlement Belge 1831–1894. Données Biographiques, Brussel, Académie Royale de Belgique, 1996, p. 593-594.

Members of the National Congress of Belgium
1791 births
1868 deaths
Mayors of the City of Brussels